A total of twelve women have served, or are serving, as the head of an Australian government. Of these, one has served as the prime minister of Australia, seven as the premier of a state and five as the chief minister of a territory. Seventeen women have also served, or are serving, as the deputy head of government in Australian states and territories; one has served as the deputy prime minister of the country, ten as the deputy premier of a state, and six as the deputy chief minister of a territory.

The first female head of government in Australia, was Rosemary Follett in 1989, who was the 1st Chief Minister of the Australian Capital Territory. Carmen Lawrence became the first female premier of a state in 1990, by serving as the 25th Premier of Western Australia. In 2010, Julia Gillard became the first, and to date, only female Prime Minister of Australia.

Today, every Australian state and territory has had at least one female government head, except for South Australia; the Australian Capital Territory has had the most, with three serving throughout its 27-year history; Queensland, New South Wales, the Northern Territory have each had a second female head of government serving in their respective jurisdiction. The most female heads to serve concurrently was four, during the 315 days of 16 May 2011 to 26 March 2012. Annastacia Palaszczuk, who has served as 39th Premier of Queensland since 14 February 2015, has the longest–serving tenure of any female head of government in Australia. The shortest tenure of a female head of government belongs to Kristina Keneally, who served as the 42nd Premier of New South Wales for a little over a year, from December 2009 to March 2011.
	
There are currently two serving female heads of government in Australia, Annastacia Palaszczuk (39th Premier of Queensland) who was elected on 14 February 2015, and Natasha Fyles (12th Chief Minister of the Northern Territory) who was appointed on 13 May 2022. Three women currently serve as deputy heads of government in Australia; Nicole Manison (Deputy Chief Minister of the Northern Territory) since 12 September 2016, Yvette Berry (Deputy Chief Minister of the Australian Capital Territory) since 31 October 2016 and Susan Close (Deputy Premier of South Australia) since 21 March 2022.

Female heads of government

Heads

Deputy heads

Female opposition leaders

Timeline

Heads 

Red represents members of the Australian Labor Party, blue represents members of the Liberal Party of Australia.

Deputy heads 

Red represents members of the Australian Labor Party, blue represents members of the Liberal Party of Australia and orange represents the Country Liberal Party.

See also
Women and government in Australia
List of elected and appointed female heads of state and government

Notes

References

External links
 Australian Electoral Commission: Electoral Milestones for Women

.
.
Women heads of government of Australian states and territories
Female heads of government
Australia
Australia